Yu Kuizhi (born 15 December 1961) is a Peking opera performer of Hui Chinese ethnicity. He plays the role of elderly men (laosheng) in Peking Opera.

Biography
Yu Kuizhi was born in Shenyang City, Liaoning Province, into a typical working-class family, his mother being a music instructor and his father being a level eight fitter. He was inspired by his mother since he was little, and was the lead singer in his primary school choir. In April 1972, only 10 years of age, he was selected to learn Peking Opera by the Shenyang Chinese Opera Institute, and was carefully taught by many of the masters of Peking Opera. He laid a solid foundation in all aspects of Peking Opera, and at the age of 13 he had been given a main role as a child in the modern Peking opera, “Da Lu Ge”, which he performed hundreds of times and received positive responses from.

In order to further his studies in the art of Peking Opera, he gave up his wages from the Shenyang Chinese Opera Institute and went to Beijing to audition for the National Academy of Chinese Theatre Arts, the top institution for studying Peking Opera. He graduated in 1982 with excellency in all his subjects, and was chosen to be part of the China National Peking Opera Company's No. 1 Troupe.

During his career, he has cooperated with many other senior Peking Opera artists, and has performed across Asia, Europe and America. In 1992, he married Leung Yee Mai from Hong Kong. They had their son Yu Wing Leung (Ferdi) in 1998.

Work experience
 In 1992, he was promoted to a national level 1 performer
 In 2001, he served as the leader of the China National Peking Opera Company No 2. Troupe
 In 2005, the China National Peking Opera Company reestablished a new No. 1 Troupe, and appointed him as leader
 In March 2010, he assumed the office of China National Peking Opera Company's art director and vice president

Representative works

Traditional operas
Da Jin Zhuan (Shang Tian Tai)
Qi Yuan Bao (Wu Pen Ji)
Wu Zi Xu
Shi Jie Ting • Kong Cheng Ji • Zhan Ma Su
Yang Jia Jiang
Ji Gu Ma Cao
Si Lang Tan Mu
Hong Zong Lie Ma
Long Feng Cheng Xiang
Ye Zhu Lin
Xiang Ma Chuan
Jiang Xiang He
Man Jiang Hong
Da Bao Guo • Tan Huang Ling • Er Jin Gong
Qing Guan Ce
Qun Ying Hui • Jie Dong Feng • Hua Rong Dao
Da Yu Sha Jia

Modern operas
 Dan Jian Ji
 Bing Sheng Sun Wu
 Da Tang Gui Fei
 Mei Lan Fang
 Zhi Yin
 Yuan Chong Huan
 Zou Xi Kou
 Feng Yu Xing Huang Qi
 Chi Bi

References

External links
美哉，于魁智！
氍毹于音 于魁智

1961 births
Chinese male Peking opera actors
Living people
National Academy of Chinese Theatre Arts alumni
20th-century Chinese  male singers
21st-century Chinese male singers
20th-century Chinese male actors
21st-century Chinese male actors
Male actors from Shenyang
Musicians from Shenyang
Singers from Liaoning
Middle School Affiliated to the National Academy of Chinese Theatre Arts alumni
Hui male actors
Hui singers